The frosted hairy dwarf porcupine (Coendou pruinosus) is a porcupine species in the family Erethizontidae from Colombia and northern and eastern Venezuela. It was formerly sometimes assigned to Sphiggurus, a genus no longer recognized since genetic studies showed it to be polyphyletic. Its karyotype has 2n = 42 and FN = 76. Its closest relative is the brown hairy dwarf porcupine (Coendou vestitus).

References

Natureserve.org

Coendou
Mammals described in 1905
Mammals of Colombia
Mammals of Venezuela
Taxa named by Oldfield Thomas